The 1936 German Ice Hockey Championship was the 20th season of the German Ice Hockey Championship, the national championship of Germany. Berliner Schlittschuhclub won the championship by defeating SC Riessersee in the final.

Quarterfinals

Semifinals

Final

References

External links
German ice hockey standings 1933-1945
Ger
German Ice Hockey Championship seasons
Champ